Ivan Kovbasnyuk (born 18 May 1993) is a Ukrainian alpine skier. He represented Ukraine at the 2018 Winter Olympics.

Skiing career
Kovbasnyuk began skiing at the age of three. His mother, who worked as an alpine skiing coach, introduced him to the sport.

As of January 2022, his best performance at the World Championships was 30th in slalom at the 2021 Championships.

He participated three times at World Cup: twice (2015, 2017) in giant slalom in Sölden, Austria, and once (2018) in super-G in Val Gardena, Italy, where he finished 61st. His best World Cup result was 58th in giant slalom in Sölden, Austria, on 25 October 2015.

In 2022, Kovbasnyuk was nominated for his second Winter Games in Beijing.

He participated at the 2013 and 2017 Winter Universiade. His best finish was 34th in downhill in 2013.

Personal life
After the 2023 World Cup, Kovbasnyuk had to join the military service against the Russian invasion of Ukraine.

Results

Winter Olympics results

World Championships results

World Cup

Results per discipline

Standings through 27 January 2022.

European Cup

Results per discipline

Standings through 27 January 2022.

Personal life
He graduated from Precarpathian National University in Ivano-Frankivsk.

References

External links
 
 Profile at PyeongChang 2018 official web page 
 Instagram profile
 Facebook profile

1993 births
Living people
Ukrainian male alpine skiers
Alpine skiers at the 2018 Winter Olympics
Alpine skiers at the 2022 Winter Olympics
Olympic alpine skiers of Ukraine
Competitors at the 2013 Winter Universiade
Competitors at the 2017 Winter Universiade
Sportspeople from Zakarpattia Oblast
Vasyl Stefanyk Subcarpathian National University alumni
Ukrainian military personnel of the 2022 Russian invasion of Ukraine
Territorial Defense Forces of Ukraine personnel